Eremiolirion is a plant genus in the family Tecophilaeaceae, first described as a genus in 2005. It has one known species, Eremiolirion amboense, native to Angola and Namibia.

References

Flora of Angola
Flora of Namibia
Monotypic Asparagales genera
Asparagales genera